Pachyiulus asiaeminoris is a species of millipede from Julidae family. It was described by Karl Wilhelm Verhoeff in 1898 and is found on Crete and in Near East.

References

Julida
Animals described in 1898
Millipedes of Asia
Millipedes of Europe